Soheila Sokhanvari (born 1964, in Shiraz, Pahlavi Iran) is an Iranian-born British artist. She left Iran in 1978 to study in the United Kingdom, and now lives in Cambridge, where she is an associate artist at the Wysing Arts Centre.

References

External Links 
 Official website
 Instagram

21st-century Iranian painters
Iranian women painters
Living people
1964 births
Alumni of Anglia Ruskin University
Alumni of Goldsmiths, University of London
Alumni of Chelsea College of Arts
21st-century Iranian women artists
Women multimedia artists
Multimedia artists
Cytogenetics